The Anglican Church of the Holy Trinity with St Edmund is a church on Wellington Hill, Horfield in Bristol, England. It has been designated as a grade II* listed building.

The west tower dates from the 15th century. It contains five bells, four of which were cast by the Bilbie family of Chew Stoke in 1773. The nave and aisles by William Butterfield date from 1847, and the chancel and crossing tower are dated 1893. The transepts were added in 1913 and 1929. The organ, which was built by Palmers of Bristol, was installed in 1885.

The church has associated with the Oxford Movement since the early 19th century. The parish and benefice fall within the Diocese of Bristol.

In 1877 the graveyard became the resting place of Newport Chartist John Frost. Although Frost's grave site was lost for many years, in the 1980s a new headstone was created and re-erected on the site, with the aid of a grant from Newport City Council. The new headstone was unveiled by Neil Kinnock.

There are also war graves of 17 British and two Canadian service personnel of World War I, and a Royal Navy sailor of World War II.

See also
 Churches in Bristol
 Grade II* listed buildings in Bristol

External links

 Horfield Parish Church
 How John Frost's Grave was rediscovered (Lecture by Richard Frame to the Friends of Newport Museum and Gallery)

Church of the Holy Trinity
Diocese of Bristol
15th-century church buildings in England
Grade II* listed churches in Bristol
Commonwealth War Graves Commission cemeteries in England